The following lists events that happened during 1964 in South Africa.

Incumbents
 State President: Charles Robberts Swart.
 Prime Minister: Hendrik Verwoerd.
 Chief Justice: Lucas Cornelius Steyn.

Events

January
 31 – The University of Port Elizabeth is established.

February
 South Africa is suspended from the International Labour Organization.

March
 11 – South Africa withdraws from the International Labour Organization.

June
 5 – South Africa is expelled from the Universal Postal Union in Vienna.
 12 – In the Rivonia Trial, Nelson Mandela's original 5-year sentence is extended to life sentence for high treason together with Denis Goldberg, Ahmed Kathrada, Govan Mbeki, Raymond Mhlaba, Andrew Mlangeni, Elias Motsoaledi and Walter Sisulu.

July
 17 – Nelson Mandela is awarded the Joliot Curie Gold Medal for Peace.
 24 – John Harris, a schoolteacher, explodes a bomb at Park Station, killing 77-year-old Ethel Rhys and injuring 23 others.

August
 18 – The International Olympic Committee bans South Africa from the Tokyo Olympics on the grounds that its teams are racially segregated.

November
 6 – Vuyisile Mini is being hanged due to death penalty for treason together with Wilson Khayinga and Zinakile Mkaba.

Unknown date
 The African National Congress establishes offices in Dar-es-Salaam.
 The Mahotella Queens are formed by producer Rupert Bopape in the Johannesburg studios of Gallo Record Company.
 The Munitions Production Board is formed in order to develop South African self-sufficiency in the manufacturing of arms.
 Neville Alexander is imprisoned on Robben Island.
November
 The Little Rivonia Trial begins.
December
 In the Little Rivonia Trial, sentence was introduced  for another treason:Wilton Mkwayi  received life sentence; Dave Kitson twenty years; Laloo Chiba eighteen years; John Matthews fifteen years and Mac Maharaj twelve years.

Births
 13 January – Laurette Maritz, golfer
 21 January – Mark Gleeson (journalist), soccer commentator & journalist
 24 February – Wendy Oldfield, singer
 18 March – Yvonne Chaka Chaka, singer & businesswoman
 5 April – Buyelekhaya Dalindyebo, King of the abaThembu
 15 April – André Joubert, rugby player
 13 April – Colleen De Reuck, long-distance runner
 16 May – Kobus Wiese, former rugby player & tv personality
 18 May – Balie Swart, rugby player
 10 June – Keketso Semoko, actress and producer
 11 July – Gavin Hunt, football coach
 20 July – Deon Lotz, actor
 26 July – Pitso Mosimane, former football player & coach
 3 August – Lucky Dube, reggae musician (d. 2007)
 19 August – Hector Pieterson, schoolboy who was shot and killed in Soweto uprising (d. 1976)
 4 September – Menzi Ngubane, actor (d. 2021)
 1 October – Roger De Sa, former football player & coach
 5 October – Masoja Msiza, actor and poet
 3 November – Brenda Fassie, singer (d. 2004)
 12 December – Ringo Madlingozi, musician

Deaths
 7 June – Charlie Llewellyn, first non-white South African test cricketer. (b. 1876)
 6 November – Vuyisile Mini, South African anti-apartheid activist. (b. 1920)

Railways

Locomotives
 The South African Railways places the first of one hundred Class 5E1, Series 3 electric locomotives in mainline service, built by Union Carriage & Wagon in Nigel, Transvaal.

Sports
 Papwa Sewgolum, an Indian golfer, wins the Dutch Open tournament for the third time.

References

South Africa
Years in South Africa
History of South Africa